A referendum on the electoral system was held in Switzerland on 23 October 1910. Voters were asked whether they approved of introducing proportional representation for National Council elections. Although the proposal was approved by a majority of cantons, it was rejected by 52.5% of voters. This was the second such referendum, after the one in 1900 also failed. However, a third referendum on the same issue was held in 1918, and passed with 66.8% in favour.

Background
The referendum was a public initiative, which required a double majority; a majority of the popular vote and majority of the cantons. The decision of each canton was based on the vote in that canton. Full cantons counted as one vote, whilst half cantons counted as half.

Results

References

1910 referendums
1910 in Switzerland
Referendums in Switzerland